

Season summary
The 2005–06 Victoria Salmon Kings season is the Salmon Kings' 2nd season in the ECHL. After a disappointing inaugural season that posted 15 wins, the Salmon Kings looked to improve in the 2005-06 season. Although the Salmon Kings improved its win total to 26 it was still not enough to clinch their first playoff berth.  Their inability to show any signs of improvement midway through the season caused the organization to fire general manager and head coach, Bryan Maxwell who was then replaced by new general manager, Dan Belisle and new head coach, Troy Ward.  The few bright spots for the Salmon Kings was Adam Taylor and defensemen, Steve Lingren who were both named starters on the National Conference ECHL All-Star team. Taylor led the team with 57 points, while Lingren scored a team leading 15 power play goals and tied for the team lead with 22 goals, alongside Lanny Gare.

Standings

Schedule and results

Regular season

Player stats

Skaters

Note: GP = Games played; G = Goals; A = Assists; Pts = Points; +/- = Plus/minus; PIM = Penalty minutes

Goaltenders
Note: GP = Games played; Min = Minutes played; W = Wins; L = Losses; T = Ties; GA = Goals against; GAA= Goals against average; Sv% = Save percentage; SO= Shutouts

†Denotes player spent time with another team before joining Victoria. Stats reflect time with the Salmon Kings only. ‡Denotes player no longer with the team. Stats reflect time with Salmon Kings only.

Transactions

Trades

Victoria Salmon Kings seasons
Victoria
Victoria